The 1981 Mercedes Cup, was a men's tennis tournament played on outdoor clay courts and held at the Tennis Club Weissenhof in Stuttgart, West Germany that was part of the 1981 Grand Prix circuit. It was the fourth edition of the tournament and was held from 13 July until 19 July 1981. First-seeded Björn Borg won the singles title.

Finals

Singles
 Björn Borg defeated  Ivan Lendl, 1–6, 7–6, 6–2, 6–4
 It was Borg's 2nd singles title of the year and the 63rd of his career.

Doubles
 Peter McNamara /  Paul McNamee defeated  Mark Edmondson /  Mike Estep, 2–6, 6–4, 7–6

References

External links
 Official website 
 ATP tournament profile

Stuttgart Open
Stuttgart Open
1981 in West German sport
July 1981 sports events in Europe
German